Davit Khocholava (born 8 February 1993) is a Georgian professional footballer who plays as a centre-back for Copenhagen and the Georgia national team.

Club career

Early years
Born in Tbilisi, Khocholava started his career in Saburtalo, where his first manager was Giorgi Devdariani. Later some of the members of his team, including Valeri Kazaishvili, Giorgi Chanturia and Lasha Parunashvili, became Georgia internationals. Khocholava was a striker during his youth career. However, Devdariani later offered him to play in defense and Khocholava accepted.

Khocholava signed for Dinamo Tbilisi in 2011. He found it difficult to become a member of the starting line-up, having a six-month loan spell at Kolkheti Poti in order to get some more playing time. In 2014, he decided to leave Tbilisi-based club and moved to Shukura Kobuleti. He was offered to the club after the recommendation of famous Georgian footballer Revaz Chelebadze, who played for Dinamo Tbilisi in Soviet era. He was the sporting director of the club.

Khocholava spent the 2014–15 season with the club before signing for Chornomorets Odesa in summer 2015. He became the regular member of the starting line-up. He was named in the symbolic team of the Ukrainian Premier League in March 2017.

Shakhtar Donetsk
In April 2017, Shakhtar Donetsk confirmed that Khocholava had signed a five-year deal with the club, joining them at the start of the following season.

Copenhagen
On 6 July 2021, Danish Superliga side F.C. Copenhagen announced they had signed Khocholava on a four year deal. On 8 August he scored his first goal for the club in a 4–2 victory in the Copenhagen Derby against rivals Brøndby IF. On 22 May 2022, with the club he won the Danish Superliga in the season 2021–22  and qualified for the UEFA Champions League for the season 2022–23.

International career
Khocholava was named in the Georgia national team's senior squad for a 2018 FIFA World Cup qualifier against Austria in September 2016. He made his debut for Georgia on 23 January 2017 in a friendly against Uzbekistan.

Career statistics

Club

International

Honours
Olimpi Rustavi
Georgian Super Cup: 2010

Dinamo Tbilisi
Georgian League: 2012–13
Georgian Cup: 2012–13

Shakhtar Donetsk
Ukrainian Premier League: 2017–18, 2018–19, 2019–20
Ukrainian Cup: 2017–18, 2018–19
Ukrainian Super Cup: 2017

Copenhagen
 Danish Superliga: 2021–22

References

External links

Davit Khocholava at football.sport.ua

1993 births
Living people
Footballers from Tbilisi
Footballers from Georgia (country)
Association football defenders
Georgia (country) international footballers
Georgia (country) youth international footballers
Georgia (country) under-21 international footballers
Erovnuli Liga players
Ukrainian Premier League players
Danish Superliga players
FC Dinamo Tbilisi players
FC Sioni Bolnisi players
FC Metalurgi Rustavi players
FC Kolkheti-1913 Poti players
FC Shukura Kobuleti players
FC Chornomorets Odesa players
FC Shakhtar Donetsk players
F.C. Copenhagen players
Expatriate footballers from Georgia (country)
Expatriate sportspeople from Georgia (country) in Ukraine
Expatriate footballers in Ukraine
Expatriate sportspeople from Georgia (country) in Denmark
Expatriate men's footballers in Denmark